Under law, polygamy is legal in the country of Somalia.

See also
Legal status of polygamy
Polygamy in Islam

References

Society of Somalia
Somalia